The Committee on International Affairs of the State Duma is a committee of the State Duma, the lower house of Russia's Federal Assembly. The committee is tasked with international relations for Russia.

Staff 
 Leonid Slutsky, Chairman of the committee.
 Svetlana Zhurova
 Vyacheslav Nikonov - First Deputy Chairman of the State Duma Committee on International Affairs
 Dmitry Novikov - First Deputy Chairman of the State Duma Committee on International Affairs. Faction of the Communist Party.
 Alexey Chepa - Deputy Chairman of the State Duma Committee on International Affairs. Faction “FAIR RUSSIA”
 Shamsail Saraliev - First Deputy Chairman of the State Duma Committee on International Affairs
 Irina Rodnina - Deputy Chairman of the State Duma Committee on International Affairs. Faction “United Russia”.
 Maria Butina - Member of the State Duma Committee on International Affairs
 Dmitry Belik - Member of the State Duma Committee on International Affairs
 Sergey Kotkin - Member of the State Duma Committee on International Affairs
 Arthur Chilingarov - Member of the State Duma Committee on International Affairs. Faction “United Russia”
 Zelimhan Mutsoev - Member of the State Duma Committee on International Affairs. Faction “United Russia”
 Valentina Tereshkova - Member of the State Duma Committee on International Affairs
 Saygidpasha Umahanov - Member of the State Duma Committee on International Affairs
 Chemeris Roza Basirovna - Member of the State Duma Committee on International Affairs

Notes

External links
 Committee on International Affairs of the State Duma, committee activity. 

1993 establishments in Russia
Federal Assembly (Russia)
Government of Russia
Tverskoy District
 
Russian entities subject to the U.S. Department of the Treasury sanctions